General elections were held in Barbados on 13 December 1948. The Barbados Labour Party remained the largest party, winning 12 of the 24 seats in the House of Assembly.

Results

Aftermath
Following the elections, K.N.R. Husbands was elected Speaker, becoming the first black man to hold the position. In 1949, Muriel Hanschell was appointed to the Legislative Council, becoming the first female member of Parliament.

References

Barbados
General election
Elections in Barbados
Election and referendum articles with incomplete results
Barbadian general election